Virgile Boumelaha (born 6 August 1983 in Mulhouse) is a French association footballer of Algerian descent; he plays for FC Grenchen.

Career 
Boumelaha began his career with FC Saint-Louis, he moved then to FC Basel and later to FC Sochaux-Montbéliard in 2002 but made two appearances for the club before joining VfB Stuttgart in 2004. He failed to break into the first team there, also,  signed for HJK Helsinki where he played 1 game over the course of the 2005/06 season. He then moved to Switzerland with SR Delémont in January 2006 where he played 19 games. After just two seasons with Delémont, he made his way to FC Gossau of the Challenge League, who he played 6 months between 18 December 2008 who left the team, he signed than in February 2009 with FC Grenchen.

Privates 
He is the younger brother of Olivier Boumelaha and the elder brother of Sabri Boumelaha.

References

External links 

http://www.football.ch/sfl/1707/de/Kader.aspx?pId=82225

1983 births
Living people
Kabyle people
French footballers
French expatriate footballers
Expatriate footballers in Switzerland
Expatriate footballers in Germany
Expatriate footballers in Finland
FC Sochaux-Montbéliard players
VfB Stuttgart II players
FC Gossau players
Helsingin Jalkapalloklubi players
SR Delémont players
Ligue 1 players
Veikkausliiga players
Swiss Challenge League players
French people of Kabyle descent
Association football midfielders
FC Basel players
Footballers from Mulhouse
French expatriate sportspeople in Finland
French expatriate sportspeople in Germany
French expatriate sportspeople in Switzerland
FC Saint-Louis Neuweg players